Nininger can refer to:

People
 Alexander R. Nininger, recipient of the Medal of Honor
 Harvey H. Nininger, meteorite collector

Place names
In the United States:
 Nininger, Minnesota, a former town
 Nininger Township, Dakota County, Minnesota